Nyctiplanes is a genus of moths of the family Crambidae. It contains only one species, Nyctiplanes polypenthes, which is found in Australia, where it has been recorded from Queensland.

References

Natural History Museum Lepidoptera genus database

Acentropinae
Monotypic moth genera
Taxa named by Alfred Jefferis Turner
Moths of Australia
Crambidae genera